The Municipality of Majšperk is a municipality in northeastern Slovenia. The seat of the municipality is Majšperk. The area is part of the traditional region of Styria. The municipality is now included in the Drava Statistical Region.

Settlements
In addition to the municipal seat of Majšperk, the municipality also includes the following settlements:

 Bolečka Vas
 Breg
 Doklece
 Dol pri Stopercah
 Grdina
 Janški Vrh
 Jelovice
 Koritno
 Kupčinji Vrh
 Lešje
 Medvedce
 Naraplje
 Planjsko
 Podlože
 Preša
 Ptujska Gora
 Sestrže
 Sitež
 Skrblje
 Slape
 Spodnja Sveča
 Stanečka Vas
 Stogovci
 Stoperce
 Zgornja Sveča

References

External links
 
Municipality of Majšperk at Geopedia
Majšperk municipal site

 
Majšperk